Ecua-Andino Hats is an Ecuadorian company founded in 1985 by Alejandro Lecaro and Édgar Sánchez. The brand is dedicated to the production and exportation of Panama hats. It is one of the most important companies producing finished Panama hats in Ecuador.

History 
In 1985, Édgar Sánchez and Alejandro Lecaro started to sell local crafts, initially to tourists on the beach, and then from a small shop in the center of Guayaquil, Ecuador. In 1994, they decided to change the product range and concentrated on hats only. In 2012, UNESCO declared that the art of weaving a Panama hat in Ecuador was added to the list of Intangible Cultural Heritage. Today, the brand exports around 200,000 a year and sells 12,000 on Ecuador’s national market.

Production 
Ecua Andino has straw hats production sites in five provinces of Ecuador such as Canar, Azuay, Guayas, Manabi and Santa Elena. The process involves at least 3500 artisans. It is in these little towns that are done the different processes such as selecting the raw material (Carludovica Palmata), cooking, weaving, bleaching, ironing, etc. Tagging and finishing steps are made in the workshop of Guayaquil. The estimated processing time before exporting a hat varies between 1 month and 6 months, it mostly depends on the quality of the product. The company new collections twice a year:

References

External links 
Official website

Hat companies
Companies of Ecuador
Banks established in 1985
Ecuadorian brands
1985 establishments in Ecuador